Biggest Bluest Hi-Fi is the debut LP from the indie pop band Camera Obscura. It was released in 2001 by Andmoresound and in 2002 by Elefant, then re-released in 2004 by Merge.

Reception

Writing for AllMusic, critic Tim Sendra praised the album, writing that it "makes a strong case for Camera Obscura as one of the best indie pop bands to come down the pike since, well, Belle and Sebastian." Marc Hogan of Pitchfork Media called it "charmingly understated."

Track listing

2002 and 2004 re-releases
"Happy New Year"
"Eighties Fan"
"Houseboat"
"Shine Like a New Pin"
"Pen and Notebook"
"Swimming Pool"
"Anti-Western"
"Let's Go Bowling"
"I Don't Do Crowds"
"The Sun on His Back"
"Double Feature"
"Arrangements of Shapes and Space"

Personnel

Band
Tracyanne Campbell – vocals, guitar
Gavin Dunbar - bass
John Henderson - vocals, percussion
Kenny Mckeeve - guitar, mandolin, vocals
Lee Thomson - drums
Lindsay Boyd - keyboards

Other
Arranged By [Strings] – Camera Obscura, Stuart Murdoch
Bells [Sleighbells] – Geoff Allan
Design, Layout – Anne Maclean
Engineer – Geoff Allan
Mastered By – Frank Arkwright
Other [The Cover Star] – Fiona Morrison
Strings – Cheryll Crockett, Elin Edwards, Greg Lawson, Lisa Webb, Lorna Leitch, Murray Ferguson
Trumpet – Nigel Baillie

References

2001 debut albums
Camera Obscura (band) albums